Plaza Cisneros, also known as Luces Park or Lights Park, is a plaza in Medellín, Colombia. It is named after the Cuban engineer Francisco Javier Cisneros, who led the construction of the Antioquia Railway. It has an artificial forest of 300 light poles, which are up to 24 meters high. The plaza used to be the main marketplace of the city.

The plaza was renovated with its current light fixtures as part of a renewal effort to rejuvenate the area. This project was called "Medellí is light".

The plaza is located among the EPM Library and the Carre and Vásquez Buildings, and the Antioquia Railway Station.

Gallery

See also

 Cisneros station

References

Parks in Medellín